Orrin James Olsen (born July 7, 1953) is a former American football center in the National Football League for the Kansas City Chiefs. Olsen played one season with the Chiefs in 1976, which was notable because two of his brothers, Merlin and Phil, were also playing in the league at the time. Prior to that, Olsen played college football for Brigham Young University.

Early years 

Olsen was born in Logan, Utah and is the youngest of Lynn and Merle Olsen’s nine children. He attended Orem High School in Orem, Utah. An all-around athlete, Olsen was named All-American in football his senior year and set a state record in discus while competing on the track team.

College career 

Olsen attended Brigham Young University in Provo, Utah, where he majored in business management and was a three-year letterman for the football team. He was coached by LaVell Edwards. His junior year, he was named pre-season All-American and first-team all-conference. BYU won the Western Athletic Conference championship that season and played in the Fiesta Bowl. In 1975, his senior season, Olsen was again named first-team all-conference. He was recognized for academic excellence by the NCAA, which awarded him a postgraduate scholarship. Olsen was also invited to participate in the Blue-Gray all-star game held in Montgomery, Alabama and the Coaches All-America Game in Lubbock, Texas.

In addition to his contributions to the football team, Olsen competed as a discus thrower on the BYU track team and participated in the NCAA championships.

Professional career 

Olsen was selected by the Chiefs in the eighth round of the 1976 NFL draft. His lone season with the Chiefs was unique because his brothers Merlin and Phil were also playing in the league, marking one of the rare times in NFL history that three brothers have played at the same time.
Since 1985, Olsen has worked for LDS Philanthropies as a Donor Liaison.

Personal 

Olsen currently lives in Alpine, Utah. He is a member of the Church of Jesus Christ of Latter-day Saints. He and his wife, Sandy, are the parents of seven children. Olsen is a skilled woodworker and has made hundreds of custom canes, including canes made for prominent Utah leaders such as Gordon B. Hinckley and Mike Leavitt.

Olsen was a member of the Mormon Tabernacle Choir from 1973–74.

References

1953 births
Living people
Players of American football from Utah
Sportspeople from Logan, Utah
BYU Cougars football players
BYU Cougars men's track and field athletes
Kansas City Chiefs players
People from Alpine, Utah
Tabernacle Choir members
American football centers